Lab Report was an improvisational, dark ambient, band created by Matthew Schultz, Eric Pounder and Chris Blazen in 1989. The experimental project gained notoriety as one of the earliest dark ambient musical projects stemming from the Industrial music genre.

History
The Chicago-based experimental band was signed to Invisible Records in 1990 and released four CDs with that label. The band became notable for their use of the sculptural dulcimer instrument known as the A.T.G. or Anti Tank Guitar created by Matthew Schultz. Lab Report membership had always been in rotation with special guests including Genesis P Orridge, Lydia Lunch, Chris Connelly, Jonny Polonsky, Chris Blazen, Becky Allen, Kerry Simonian, Derek Frederickson, Tom Slattery, Dan Burke and more.

Matthew Schultz went on as the head of Lab Report and released three more albums with the Gein label. The project's musical style broadened to covered a wide range and became increasingly multimedia.

Discography
Fig X-71 (1991) (Invisible Records)
Unhealthy (1993) (Invisible Records)
Terminal (1995) (Invisible Records)
Excision (1997) (Invisible Records)
All Your Little Pieces, Make Me a Whole (1998) (Gein Records)
-Classical -Atmospheres (1999) (Gein Records)
2000 After Death Live (2000) (Gein Records)

Compilations

 Industrial Revolution - First Edition (1993)
 Industrial Revolution - Second Edition (1994)
 Total Devotion (1994)
 Invisible Route Six Six Six (1995)
 Can You See It Yet? (1995)
 Drug Test 1 & 2 (1995)
 Drug Test 3 & 4 (1997)
 F*cking Sick and Menacing (1097)
 Ultrasonik (1998)
 Eye Grind Disturbance? (1998)
 Gone Too Far (1999)
 The Information Apocalypse Comp (2002)

References

External links
Official website

Avant-garde ensembles
Musical groups from Chicago
American industrial music groups
American noise rock music groups
Musical groups established in 1989
American experimental musical groups